Argonia is a city in Sumner County, Kansas, United States.  As of the 2020 census, the population of the city was 456.

History
Argonia was founded in 1881. It was named for the ship Argo in Greek mythology. In 1887, Susanna M. Salter became the first woman to win political office in United States history when she was elected Mayor of Argonia as a member of the Prohibition Party.

Geography
Argonia is located at  (37.265299, -97.766123).

Demographics

2010 census
As of the census of 2010, there were 501 people, 216 households, and 135 families living in the city. The racial makeup of the city was 96.6% White, 0.8% African American, 0.6% Native American, and 2.0% from two or more races. Hispanic or Latino of any race were 1.6% of the population.

There were 216 households, of which 32.9% had children under the age of 18 living with them, 44.4% were married couples living together, 13.0% had a female householder with no husband present, 5.1% had a male householder with no wife present, and 37.5% were non-families. 33.8% of all households were made up of individuals, and 14.8% had someone living alone who was 65 years of age or older. The average household size was 2.32 and the average family size was 2.96.

The median age in the city was 38.6 years. 25.9% of residents were under the age of 18; 10.5% were between the ages of 18 and 24; 22.2% were from 25 to 44; 22.6% were from 45 to 64; and 19% were 65 years of age or older. The gender makeup of the city was 47.5% male and 52.5% female.

2000 census
As of the census of 2000, there were 534 people, 225 households, and 146 families living in the city. The racial makeup of the city was 96.82% White, 0.37% African American, 0.37% from other races, and 2.43% from two or more races. Hispanic or Latino of any race were 0.19% of the population.

There were 225 households, out of which 25.8% had children under the age of 18 living with them, 54.7% were married couples living together, 8.9% had a female householder with no husband present, and 34.7% were non-families. 34.2% of all households were made up of individuals, and 22.7% had someone living alone who was 65 years of age or older. The average household size was 2.37 and the average family size was 3.04.

In the city, the population was spread out, with 26.4% under the age of 18, 6.9% from 18 to 24, 22.5% from 25 to 44, 21.7% from 45 to 64, and 22.5% who were 65 years of age or older. The median age was 41 years. For every 100 females, there were 94.2 males. For every 100 females age 18 and over, there were 92.6 males.

The median income for a household in the city was $30,125, and the median income for a family was $38,625. Males had a median income of $30,938 versus $19,688 for females. The per capita income for the city was $16,060. About 8.9% of families and 8.8% of the population were below the poverty line, including 8.5% of those under age 18 and 13.4% of those age 65 or over.

Education
The community is served by Argonia USD 359 public school district.

The Argonia Red Raiders of Argonia High School won the following Kansas State High School championships:
 1969 Boys Basketball - Class 1A
 2011 Girls Basketball - Class 1A-II

Notable people
 Susanna M. Salter was elected mayor of Argonia in 1887, becoming the first woman elected mayor in the United States.

References

Further reading

External links
 City of Argonia
 Argonia - Directory of Public Officials
 Argonia city map, KDOT

Cities in Kansas
Cities in Sumner County, Kansas
Wichita, KS Metropolitan Statistical Area
1881 establishments in Kansas
Populated places established in 1881